Émery Fleury (February 10, 1901 – October 16, 1975) was a Canadian politician and a three-term member of the Legislative Assembly of Quebec.

Background

He was born on February 10, 1901, in Saint-Léonard-d'Aston, Centre-du-Québec and became a dairy farmer.

Political career

Fleury ran as a Conservative candidate in the district of Nicolet in the 1935 election and lost.  He won a seat to the Legislative Assembly of Quebec as a Union Nationale candidate in the 1936 election against Liberal candidate Alexandre Gaudet.  Fleury was defeated by Liberal candidate Henri-Napoléon Biron in the 1939 election, but won back his seat in the 1944 election and was re-elected in the 1948 election.  He did not run for re-election in the 1952 election.

Retirement

From 1963 to 1970, Fleury was a municipal public servant in Trois-Rivières.  He died on October 16, 1975.

References

1901 births
1975 deaths
People from Centre-du-Québec
Union Nationale (Quebec) MNAs